Ealdberht may refer to

Ealdbert or Ealdberht (died 725), an Aetheling and rebel from Wessex
Aldberht (died c. 784), a medieval Bishop of Hereford